DWAN may refer to:

 DWAN-AM, a defunct AM radio station broadcasting in Metro Manila.
 DWAN-FM, an FM radio station broadcasting in Puerto Princesa, branded as DWIZ Palawan.